Ekkehard of Aura (born c. 1080, died 20th February, 1126) was the first Abbot of Aura (a monastery founded by Otto, Bishop of Bamberg, on the Franconian Saale river, near Bad Kissingen, Bavaria) from 1108. It is thought that Ekkehard was a member of the Bavarian aristocracy. 

A Benedictine monk and chronicler, he made updates to the World Chronicle (Chronicon universale) of Frutolf of Michelsberg, adding important German history between 1098 and 1125 during the reign of Emperor Henry V, in which he sided strongly with the papacy in the Investiture Controversy. He was a participant in the Crusade of 1101 (Lerner, 1989), and provided important source material for the Rhineland massacres of Jews and for the First Crusade.

While the Crusade of 1101 was considered a failure, Ekkehard did manage to journey to Jerusalem, although his stay in the Holy City was only brief. He returned from the Holy Land via Rome, before returning to Germany, where he became a monk at the abbey of Tegernsee in 1102/03 before moving to  Michaelsberg abbey near Bamberg, although these claims have been contested. It is also thought that Ekkehard spent some time in Würzburg, due to the dedication he included when writing the Life of St Burchard. It was here that Ekkehard met Otto of Bamberg, who would later go on to found the monastary of Aura and install Ekkehard as its first abbot. Aura was founded to be part of the Hirsau network of monasteries, which were hugely influential nodes in a network of reform-minded monasteries.

References

Further reading
Ekkehard of Aura from the Catholic Encyclopedia
Albert of Aix and Ekkehard of Aura, "Emico and the Slaughter of the Rhineland Jews" from the Internet Medieval Sourcebook
Ekkehard of Aura, Hierosolymita and World Chronicle (On the Crusades) from the Internet Medieval Sourcebook
Robert E. Lerner, "Ekkerhard of Aura", Dictionary of the Middle Ages, Volume 4, pp. 417–418, 1989. 
McCarthy, T. J. H., Chronicles of the Investiture Contest: Frutolf of Michelsberg and his continuators. Manchester: Manchester Medieval Sources. 2014. .

11th-century births
1126 deaths
12th-century German historians
Historians of the Crusades
Medieval writers about the Crusades
Christians of the Crusade of 1101
Christian anti-Judaism in the Middle Ages
12th-century Latin writers